Chromosome 2 open reading frame 54, otherwise known as Mab21L4, is a protein that in humans is encoded by the C2orf54 gene. The orthologue in mice is 2310007B03Rik.

Model organisms 

				
Model organisms have been used in the study of C2orf54 function. A conditional knockout mouse line, called 2310007B03Riktm1a(KOMP)Wtsi was generated as part of the International Knockout Mouse Consortium program — a high-throughput mutagenesis project to generate and distribute animal models of disease to interested scientists — at the Wellcome Trust Sanger Institute.

Male and female animals underwent a standardized phenotypic screen to determine the effects of deletion. Twenty three tests were carried out on mutant mice, but no significant abnormalities were observed.

References 
 

Human proteins
Genes mutated in mice
Uncharacterized proteins